Trichodes punctatus is a species of checkered beetle in the family Cleridae. It is found mainly in southeastern Europe.

References

External links

 

punctatus